We Are an African People: Independent Education, Black Power, and the Radical Imagination is a 2016 intellectual history of subaltern education in the United States, written by Russell Rickford and published by Oxford University Press.

Sources 

 
 
 
 
 https://www.aaihs.org/tag/weareanafricanpeople/
 https://www.aaihs.org/prefiguring-the-african-american-postcolony/
 https://www.aaihs.org/we-are-an-african-people-and-the-dynamism-of-black-power-studies/
 https://www.aaihs.org/african-men-and-women-patriarchy-and-pan-africanism/
 https://www.aaihs.org/we-are-equal-african-peoples/
 https://www.aaihs.org/pragmatic-black-nationalism/
 https://www.aaihs.org/the-pragmatic-utopia-an-authors-response/

External links 

 
 

2016 non-fiction books
English-language books
History books about the United States
Works about African-Americans
History books about education
Oxford University Press books